The Ordnance BL 5-inch howitzer was initially introduced to provide the Royal Field Artillery with continuing explosive shell capability following the decision to concentrate on shrapnel for field guns in the 1890s.

Combat service

Sudan Campaign
The weapon was used by the Royal Field Artillery and served successfully at the Battle of Omdurman in 1898. During that campaign they gained the distinction of being the first British guns to fire the new Lyddite shells in action.

Second Boer War
Major D Hall states that in the Second Boer War the Lyddite shells often failed to detonate; the gun was too heavy to be used as a field howitzer, and for siege use its range was too short and shell too light. However, it achieved some success in Natal when able to get close enough to bombard Boers in trenches.

World War I
By 1908 it was obsolete and replaced in British Regular Army brigades by the modern QF 4.5-inch howitzer.

Territorial Force brigades, however, continued to use the howitzer in World War I into 1916, including notably at the ANZAC and Suvla beachheads, Gallipoli, and in the East African campaign.

Administrative error led to the new 40-pound shells being sent to Gallipoli without range tables or fuze keys for the new pattern fuzes, rendering them useless.

Gallery

Ammunition

See also 
Howitzer
List of howitzers

Notes and references

Bibliography
 Text Book of Gunnery, 1902. LONDON : PRINTED FOR HIS MAJESTY'S STATIONERY OFFICE, BY HARRISON AND SONS, ST. MARTIN'S LANE 
Dale Clarke, British Artillery 1914-1919. Field Army Artillery. Osprey Publishing, Oxford UK, 2004 
 Major Darrell D. Hall, "Guns in South Africa 1899-1902" in The South African Military History Society. Military History Journal - Vol 2 No 1, June 1971
 I.V. Hogg & L.F. Thurston, British Artillery Weapons & Ammunition 1914-1918. London: Ian Allan, 1972
 Brigadier-General Sir Hugh Simpson-Baikie, Ex-Commander of the British artillery at Cape Helles. Appendix I STATEMENT ON ARTILLERY in  General Sir Ian Hamilton, G.C.B. Gallipoli Diary Vol. II. New York: George H. Doran Company, 1920
 Hogg, Ian. Twentieth-Century Artillery. New York: Barnes & Noble Books, 2000.  Pg.46
 România în războiul mondial 1916-1919, Documente, Anexe, Volumul 1, Monitorul Oficial și Imprimeriile Statului, București. Pg. 42

Surviving examples
At Karak Castle, Jordan
National Military Museum, Bucharest, Romania

External links

 Handbook for the 5-inch B.L. howitzer 1905 Hosted online by State Library of Victoria, Australia
 Field service manual Field artillery howitzer brigade 5-inch B.L. 1908 Hosted online by State Library of Victoria, Australia
 Handbook for the 5-inch B.L. howitzer, 1909 Hosted online by State Library of Victoria, Australia
 Handbook and equipment details for the 5-inch B.L. howitzer Mark I field batteries 1896,1901 Hosted online by State Library of Victoria, Australia
 5 inch B.L. howitzer gun drill 1915 Hosted online by State Library of Victoria, Australia
Great War Diary - German East Africa 1916 - of Sergeant Joseph Daniel Fewster, 1st. (Hull) Heavy Battery R.G.A.
Bennet Burleigh, Khartoum Campaign, 1898 Describes 5-inch howitzer use in the campaign

Field artillery
Victorian-era weapons of the United Kingdom
World War I howitzers
World War I artillery of the United Kingdom
127 mm artillery